Starvation Lake is a book written by Bryan Gruley and published by Touchstone Books (an imprint of Simon & Schuster) on 3 March 2009, which later went on to win the Anthony Award for Best Paperback Original and Nominee for Best First Novel in 2010.

References 

Anthony Award-winning works
American mystery novels
American crime novels
2009 American novels